Waña (Aymara for dry, Quechua for a potato variety, Hispanicized spelling Huaña) is a mountain in the Wansu mountain range in the Andes of Peru, about  high. It is situated in the Cusco Region, Chumbivilcas Province, Santo Tomás District. Waña lies northwest of Wamanripa, northeast of Chankuwaña, east of Wayunka and southeast of Ikma.

References 

Mountains of Cusco Region